Acrocercops argyrosema is a moth of the family Gracillariidae. It is known from Queensland, Australia.

References

Argyrosema
Moths described in 1947
Moths of Australia